William Robert Parks (October 13, 1915 – July 13, 2003) was the 11th president of Iowa State University, and the first social scientist to become president of the university.

Biography
Parks studied for his BA in political science at Berea College, Kentucky, graduating in 1937. He went on to earn a MA in political science from the University of Kentucky in 1938, and a PhD from the University of Wisconsin–Madison in 1945.

He worked in research and administration with the U.S. Bureau of Agricultural Economics from 1940 - 1948, and became a Lieutenant of the United States Navy during World War II. He was Professor of Government at Iowa State University from 1948 - 1956, and then Professor of Agricultural Economics at University of Wisconsin–Madison from 1956 - 1958.

He was Dean of Instruction at ISU from 1958 - 1961, and was named Vice President of Academic Affairs (1961 - 1965). He became the 11th president of ISU in 1965, serving in that post until 1986.

During his career, Parks was Head of the National Association of State Universities and Land Grant Colleges, Head of the Association of American Universities, Head of the Council of Presidents, Head of the Mid-American State Universities Association, and Head of the Association of Iowa College Presidents. He was a member of the board of trustees of the Teachers Insurance and Annuities-College Retirement Equities Fund, and was on the board of directors of Norwestern Bell and Central Life Assurance. He received honorary doctorates from Bear College (1966), Westmar College (1968), Drake University (1968), and University of Kentucky (1973). He was named honorary alumnus of ISU in 1969. The ISU university library was named the W. Robert and Ellen Sorge Parks Library in 1984. Parks received the first Christian Petersen Design Award for his leadership in establishing ISU's College of Design.

Personal life
Parks married Ellen Sorge (1914–1999) and had two daughters: Andrea (Van Howeling) and Cynthia (Hamilton).  Ellen was the first woman to receive a PhD in political science from the University of Wisconsin–Madison.

References

Further reading
W. Robert Parks Papers, RS 2/11, Special Collections Department, Iowa State University Library.

1915 births
2003 deaths
Berea College alumni
University of Wisconsin–Madison alumni
American political scientists
Presidents of Iowa State University
Place of birth missing
20th-century American academics
20th-century political scientists